|}

The Prix Fille de l'Air is a Group 3 flat horse race in France open to thoroughbred fillies and mares aged three years or older. It is run at Toulouse over a distance of 2,100 metres (about 1 mile and 2½ furlongs), and it is scheduled to take place each year in November.

History
The event is named after Fille de l'Air, a successful French-trained filly in the 1860s. It was established in 1902, and was originally held at Maisons-Laffitte. It was initially contested over 2,400 metres, and was extended to 2,600 metres in 1906. It reverted to its former length in 1913, and was cut to 2,000 metres the following year.

Due to World War I, the race was abandoned from 1915 to 1919. It was transferred to Saint-Cloud in 1921, and restored to 2,400 metres in 1924. It was shortened to 2,100 metres in 1929.

The Prix Fille de l'Air was cancelled twice during World War II, in 1940 and 1941. It was staged at Longchamp in 1942, Le Tremblay in 1943 and Auteuil in 1944. It was held at Longchamp again in 1945, and returned to Saint-Cloud in 1946.

The present system of race grading was introduced in 1971, and the Prix Fille de l'Air was classed at Group 3 level. For a period it took place in June.

The race was moved to late October in 1990, and to November in 1991. It took place at Évry in 1995 and 1996. It was transferred to Toulouse in 1997, and since then it has been usually run on the French public holiday of Armistice Day.

Records
Most successful horse (2 wins):
 Punta Gorda – 1906, 1907
 Ahohoney – 1984, 1985
 Ambition - 2019, 2021

Leading jockey (4 wins):
 Alfred Gibert – Kalinia (1969), Miss Dan (1970), Sybarite (1973), Irena (1975)

Leading trainer (4 wins):
 Charles Defeyer – Quoi (1924), Larsy (1928), Rollybuchy (1929), Mascotte (1942)
 François Boutin – Satu (1968), Snow Day (1981), Liastra (1986), Mystery Rays (1988)
 André Fabre – Savoureuse Lady (1990), Dance Dress (2002), Walkamia (2003), Tashelka (2007)

Leading owner (4 wins):
 Marcel Boussac – Pharelle (1945), Caraida (1955), Arbela (1961), Artania (1963)

Winners since 1979

Earlier winners

 1902: Reine des Fleurs
 1903: La Camargo
 1904: Sofia
 1905: Luzerne
 1906: Punta Gorda
 1907: Punta Gorda
 1908: Mafia II
 1909: Messaouda
 1910: Ma Cherie
 1911: Basse Pointe
 1912: Tripolette
 1913: Ardeche
 1914: Rivista
 1915–19: no race
 1920: Maskara
 1921: Herlies
 1922: Finetta
 1923: Solange
 1924: Quoi
 1925: Lotus Lily
 1926: Briseis
 1927: La Desirade
 1928: Larsy
 1929: Rollybuchy
 1930: Merveille
 1931: Halston
 1932: Sans Rancune
 1933: Arabia
 1934: Anatolie
 1935: Blue Bell
 1936: Pamina
 1937: Cosquilla
 1938: Adieu
 1939: Pereire
 1940–41: no race
 1942: Mascotte
 1943: Lady Cast
 1944: Orthez
 1945: Pharelle
 1946: Plouvien
 1947: Fair Eire
 1948: Chez Elle
 1949:
 1950:
 1951: Hero
 1952:
 1953: Radio
 1954: Reine d'Atout
 1955: Caraida
 1956: Resabiada
 1957: Fussy
 1958: Denisy
 1959: Ornifle
 1960: Rivesarthe
 1961: Arbela
 1962: Nebalie
 1963: Artania
 1964: Arnica
 1965: Dame de la Cour
 1966: Nursery Song
 1967: Cranberry Sauce
 1968: Satu
 1969: Kalinia
 1970: Miss Dan
 1971: Azella
 1972: Northern Tavern
 1973: Sybarite
 1974: Premiere Harde
 1975: Irena
 1976: Gramy
 1977: Silver Bells
 1978: Twilight Hour

See also
 List of French flat horse races

References
 France Galop / Racing Post:
 france-galop.com – A Brief History: Prix Fille de l'Air.
 galopp-sieger.de – Prix Fille de l'Air.
 horseracingintfed.com – International Federation of Horseracing Authorities – Prix Fille de l'Air (2016).
 pedigreequery.com – Prix Fille de l'Air – Toulouse.

Middle distance horse races for fillies and mares
Horse races in France
Recurring sporting events established in 1902